The Somawathiya Chaitya is a Buddhist Stupa situated in the ancient city of Polonnaruwa, Sri Lanka. Chaitya premises is called the Somawathiya Rajamaha Viharaya.

The Somawathiya Chaitya is located within the Somawathiya National Park  on the left bank of the Mahaweli River, and is believed to have been built long before the time of Dutugamunu enshrining the right canine Relic of the tooth of the Buddha. It is attributed to the reign of King Kavan Tissa - Dutugemunu's father - who ruled Magama. Somawathiya is therefore much older than Ruwanwelisaya, Mirisawetiya Vihara or Jetavanaramaya.

The stupa is named after Princess Somawathi, the sister of King Kavantissa, and the wife of regional ruler Prince Giri Abhaya. The prince built the stupa to enshrine the right tooth relic of the Buddha, obtained from Arahat Mahinda, and named the stupa after the princess. Upon completion of the stupa and other constructions, the prince and princess handed over the temple to Arahat Mahinda and other monks.

Gallery

See also
Ancient Constructions of Sri Lanka
Atamasthana
Buddhism
Mahawamsa

References

Other reading
 
 
 
 

Religious buildings and structures in Polonnaruwa
Buddhist temples in Polonnaruwa District
Stupas in Sri Lanka
Archaeological protected monuments in Polonnaruwa District